Mollendo Airport  is a regional airport that serves the Pacific coast town of Mollendo in the Arequipa Region of Peru. It has one runway and is operational only during the daytime.

See also 

Transport in Peru
List of airports in Peru

References

External links 
OpenStreetMap - Mollendo
SkyVector Aeronautical Charts

Airports in Peru
Buildings and structures in Arequipa Region